Poland Township is one of the fourteen townships of Mahoning County, Ohio, United States. The 2010 census found 14,960 people in the township.

Geography
Located in the eastern part of the county along the Pennsylvania border, it borders the following townships:
Coitsville Township - north
Pulaski Township, Lawrence County, Pennsylvania - northeast
Mahoning Township, Lawrence County, Pennsylvania - east
North Beaver Township, Lawrence County, Pennsylvania - southeast corner
Springfield Township - south
Boardman Township - west
Struthers - northwest

Three municipalities are located in Poland Township:
The village of Lowellville, in the east
Part of the village of Poland, in the west
Part of the city of Struthers, in the northwest

Name and history
It is the only Poland Township statewide. It was established in 1796.

Government
The township is governed by a three-member board of trustees, who are elected in November of odd-numbered years to a four-year term beginning on the following January 1. Two are elected in the year after the presidential election and one is elected in the year before it. There is also an elected township fiscal officer, who serves a four-year term beginning on April 1 of the year after the election, which is held in November of the year before the presidential election. Vacancies in the fiscal officership or on the board of trustees are filled by the remaining trustees.

References

External links
Township website
County website

Townships in Mahoning County, Ohio
Townships in Ohio
Populated places established in 1796
1796 establishments in the Northwest Territory